Governor Stewart may refer to:

Duncan Stewart (British diplomat) (1904–1949), 2nd Governor of Sarawak in 1949
John Wolcott Stewart (1825–1915), 33rd Governor of Vermont
Robert Marcellus Stewart (1815–1871), 14th Governor of Missouri
Sam V. Stewart (1872–1939), 6th Governor of Montana

See also
Governor Stuart (disambiguation)